Acanthophorides is a genus of flies in the family Phoridae.

Species
A. clavicercus Borgmeier, 1967
A. condei Borgmeier, 1928
A. divergens Borgmeier, 1926
A. incomptus Schmitz, 1927
A. labidophilus Borgmeier, 1967
A. longicornis (Borgmeier, 1923)
A. pilosicauda Borgmeier, 1967

References

Phoridae
Platypezoidea genera